Peri Suzan Özkum Günay (born 29 March 1959) is a Turkish and American paediatrician and former diver. She competed in the women's 3 metre springboard event at the 1976 Summer Olympics.

Education
Günay completed her BA in Psychology and Social Relations at Radcliffe College (1977-81) followed by her M.D. in Medicine at Dartmouth College (1982-86). She then completed an internship and residency in General Pediatrics at Northwestern University (1986-89).

Awards
Greater Newport Physicians, Primary Care Provider of the Year (2000; 2017; and 2019)
Top Doctors of Orange County, Orange Coast Magazine (2004-2007)

Personal life
Günay is the daughter of a Turkish father and an American mother. She is married to Mustafa Günay and has been residing in California in the United States.

References

1959 births
Living people
American people of Turkish descent
Turkish female divers
Olympic divers of Turkey
Divers at the 1976 Summer Olympics
Place of birth missing (living people)
Geisel School of Medicine alumni
Radcliffe College alumni